John George Archer (9 April 1936 – 1987) was an English professional footballer who played as a goalkeeper.

After starting his career at hometown Kent League club Whitstable Town he transferred to Football League Third Division North club Grimsby Town for whom, whilst only 18 years old, he made 10 appearances during which he saved three successive penalties. 

Early in 1955, having been granted release from his contract with Grimsby, he returned to Whitstable. Thereafter he turned out for other Kent clubs Canterbury City, a third spell at Whitstable Town, Ashford Town and Margate before returning in 1963 as an Amateur player to now Aetolian League Whitstable Town. "Bonny" as he was locally known made a total of over 100 appearances over his four spells at Whitstable Town - his last two matches in April 1964 were notable: he was sent-off in the first and left the field injured in the second.

References

External links
John Archer profile, Margate Football Club History 

1936 births
1987 deaths
People from Whitstable
English footballers
Association football goalkeepers
Whitstable Town F.C. players
Grimsby Town F.C. players
Canterbury City F.C. players
Ashford United F.C. players
Margate F.C. players
English Football League players
Kent Football League (1894–1959) players